Robert De Lacey (1892–1976) was an American film director of the silent era. Working at the FBO studios, he specialized in making westerns.

Selected filmography

Editor
 Held In Trust (1920)
 Boy of Mine (1923)
 Mighty Lak' a Rose (1923)
 The Girl of the Golden West (1923)
 A Son of the Sahara (1924)
 The Flaming Forties (1924)

Director
 Let's Go, Gallagher (1925)
 The Wyoming Wildcat (1925)
 The Cowboy Musketeer (1925)
 The Cowboy Cop (1926)
 The Arizona Streak (1926)
 Out of the West (1926)
 The Masquerade Bandit (1926)
 Born to Battle (1926)
 Red Hot Hoofs (1926)
 Tom and His Pals (1926)
 Wild to Go (1926)
 Tom's Gang (1927)
 Splitting the Breeze (1927)
 The Cherokee Kid (1927)
 The Sonora Kid (1927)
 The Flying U Ranch (1927)
 Lightning Lariats (1927)
 Red Riders of Canada (1928)
 Tyrant of Red Gulch (1928)
 When the Law Rides (1928)
 King Cowboy (1928)
 The Drifter (1929)
 Idaho Red (1929)
 The Pride of Pawnee (1929)
 Pardon My Gun (1930)

References

Bibliography
 Munden, Kenneth White. The American Film Institute Catalog of Motion Pictures Produced in the United States, Part 1. University of California Press, 1997.

External links

1892 births
1976 deaths
American film editors
American film directors
People from Illinois